The 2018 Sparkassen ATP Challenger was a professional tennis tournament played on indoor hard courts in Ortisei, Italy between 8 and 14 October 2018. It was the ninth edition of the tournament which was part of the 2018 ATP Challenger Tour.

Singles main-draw entrants

Seeds

 1 Rankings are as of 1 October 2018.

Other entrants
The following players received wildcards into the singles main draw:
  Raúl Brancaccio
  Liam Caruana
  Luca Giacomini
  Jannik Sinner

The following players received entry from the qualifying draw:
  Benjamin Hassan
  Kirill Kivattsev
  Kevin Krawietz
  Tobias Simon

The following player received entry as a lucky loser:
  Fabrizio Ornago

Champions

Singles

  Ugo Humbert def.  Pierre-Hugues Herbert 6–4, 6–2.

Doubles

 Sander Gillé /  Joran Vliegen def.  Purav Raja /  Antonio Šančić 3–6, 6–3, [10–3].

References

External links
Official Website

2018 ATP Challenger Tour
2018
October 2018 sports events in Italy
2018 in Italian tennis